Apartment Troubles is a 2014 American comedy-drama film written, directed by, and starring Jess Weixler and Jennifer Prediger. The film marks the screenwriting and directorial debut of both Weixler and Prediger.

Plot
Olivia and Nicole share an apartment in New York City, where they pay an illegal sublease to a landlord with whom they have under-the-table arrangement. When Olivia's cat dies, she and Nicole travel to Hollywood to visit her aunt, Kimberly, who works as a judge at American Idol competitor, That Special Something.

Cast
Jess Weixler as Nicole
Jennifer Prediger as Olivia
Megan Mullally as Aunt Kimberley
Will Forte
Jeffrey Tambor
Bob Byington as Uncle Robert

Reception
On review aggregator website Rotten Tomatoes, the film has a rating of 43% based on reviews from 7 critics, with an average rating of 4.3/10. Sandie Angulo Chen of Common Sense Media awarded the film one star out of four. Kate Erbland of The Dissolve awarded it three stars out of five.

Geoff Berkshire of Variety called Apartment Troubles "a slight and only mildly amusing buddy comedy".

Justin Lowe of The Hollywood Reporter, wrote: "Creative miscalculation rarely gets celebrated so enthusiastically".

According to Michael Nordine of IndieWire, the comedy that he seen was "awry".

References

External links

American comedy-drama films
Films set in apartment buildings
2014 directorial debut films
2014 comedy-drama films
2010s English-language films
2010s American films